Dushan in Iran may refer to:
 Dushan, Kerman (دوشن - Dūshan)
 Dushan, Kurdistan (دوشان - Dūshān)